The brown topknot, Notoclinus compressus, is a triplefin of the family Tripterygiidae, endemic to New Zealand in rock pools and from low water to depths of about 5 m, in reef areas of broken rock and large brown seaweed of genera Carpophyllum and Cystophora.  Its length is up to about 8.5 cm.

Size
Max length : 8.5 cm

Environment and climate
The brown topknot lives in marine demersal at a depth range of around 5 meters and in Temperate climate.

Distribution
This brown topknot species is found in the Southwest Pacific in New Zealand and is usually living in large brown algae.

References

Notoclinus
Endemic marine fish of New Zealand
Fish described in 1872